Paul Parin (20 September 1916 – 18 May 2009) was a Swiss psychoanalyst, author and ethnologist.

He was born in Polzela, near Celje, Slovenia, then part of the Austro-Hungarian Empire, into a family of assimilated Jews. He studied medicine in Zagreb, Graz and Zürich. In Zürich, he met Goldy Matthèy-Guenet who became his wife. At the end of World War II, the two travelled to the liberated zone in south-east Yugoslavia, where they volunteered as physicians in the units of the partisan resistance. After the War, the two moved back to Zürich, where Parin founded a psychoanalytic seminar. In the 1950s, he travelled to Africa with his wife and Fritz Morgenthaler. Together with George Devereux, Parin became the co-founder of the ethnopsychoanalysis.

In 1992, he received the prestigious Erich Fried Prize for his literary achievements.

He died in Zürich, aged 92.

See also
Hans Bosse, German sociologist who performed research on ethnopsychoanalysis

References

1916 births
2009 deaths
Swiss psychoanalysts
Swiss ethnologists
Swiss medical writers
Yugoslav emigrants to Switzerland
People from the Municipality of Polzela